Patrick O. Dooley, known as Paddy Dooley (27 March 1926 – 12 December 2008) was an Irish rower. He competed in the men's eight event at the 1948 Summer Olympics.

References

External links
 

1926 births
2008 deaths
Irish male rowers
Olympic rowers of Ireland
Rowers at the 1948 Summer Olympics
Sportspeople from Limerick (city)
20th-century Irish people